Dalco Passage is a tidal strait within Puget Sound in the U.S. state of Washington. Located between the southern end of Vashon Island and the mainland near Tacoma, Dalco Passage connects the northern main Puget Sound basin to the southern basin, via the Tacoma Narrows strait. Colvos Passage, Commencement Bay, and Quartermaster Harbor are also connected to Dalco Passage.

A US Coast Survey report said the name "Dalco" was given by the Wilkes expedition, 1841, however the origin of the name is unknown.

References

External links
 

Bodies of water of King County, Washington
Straits of Washington (state)
Landforms of Puget Sound
Bodies of water of Pierce County, Washington